The Polish Investment and Trade Agency (abbreviated to PAIH) is a Polish government agency which promotes Poland as an attractive destination for foreign investment.

History 

In 1992, the Polish Agency for Foreign Investment (PAIZ) was created, which in 2003 was merged with the Polish Information Agency (PAI) to form the currently named Polish Information and Foreign Investment Agency (PAIiIZ) to co-ordinate the promotion of Poland as an attractive destination for foreign investment. In 2017 the Agency change the name to Polish Investment and Trade Agency (PAIH)

Role 

Aside from the promotion of Poland for economic investment, PAIH also assists investors to overcome the administrative and legal hurdles that one must jump over when investing in Poland. The agency conducts investor surveys to determine the outlook of the investment climate in Poland. Its reports occasionally inform initiatives pursued by the Ministry of Economy.

See also 

 Why didn't you invest in Eastern Poland?

References

External links 

 Polish Information and Foreign Investment Agency

Foreign trade of Poland
Government agencies of Poland
Investment promotion agencies